UAN is a solution of urea and ammonium nitrate in water used as a fertilizer.

Uan or UAN may also refer to:
 Adapa, an alternate name for the first of the Mesopotamian seven sages
 Autonomous University of Nayarit ((), a Mexican public university based in the city of Tepic, Nayarit
 Kuan language (Laos), by ISO 639-3 language code
 United American Nurses, formerly an American union affiliated with the AFL-CIO
  (National Academic Union), a learned society in Italy
 Universal Account Number, a 12-digit number allotted to employee who is contributing to the Employees' Provident Fund Organisation of India

People
 Uan Rasey (1921–2011), an American musician
 Mariuti Uan (born 1986), a sprinter from Kiribati
 Viktor Uan (born 1994), a Russian football defender